Mariya Shishkova (born 21 September 1953) is a Bulgarian sprinter. She competed in the women's 100 metres at the 1980 Summer Olympics.

References

External links
 

1953 births
Living people
Athletes (track and field) at the 1980 Summer Olympics
Bulgarian female sprinters
Olympic athletes of Bulgaria
Place of birth missing (living people)
Olympic female sprinters
21st-century Bulgarian women
20th-century Bulgarian women